Epistemicism is a position about vagueness in the philosophy of language or metaphysics, according to which there are facts about the boundaries of a vague predicate which we cannot possibly discover.  Given a vague predicate, such as 'is thin' or 'is bald', epistemicists hold that there is some sharp cutoff, dividing cases where a person, for example, is thin from those in which they are not.  As a result, a statement such as "Saul is thin" is either true or false. The statement does not, as other theories of vagueness might claim, lack a truth-value – even if the determinate truth-value is beyond our epistemological grasp.  Epistemicism gets its name because it holds that there is no semantic indeterminacy present in vague terms, only epistemic uncertainty.

Epistemicism was historically considered an untenable position, since it requires vague terms to possess extremely specific conditions of application.  Since the publication of Timothy Williamson's 1994 book, Vagueness, which defended the view, it has been taken seriously by many philosophers working in the area.

References
Williamson, T. 1994. Vagueness London: Routledge.

Epistemological theories
Metaphysical theories
Theories of language